Massularia is a genus of flowering plants belonging to the family Rubiaceae.

Its native range is Western and Western Central Tropical Africa.

Species
Species:

Massularia acuminata 
Massularia stevartiana

References

Rubiaceae
Rubiaceae genera